Statue of Christopher Columbus (Boston) may refer to:

 Statue of Christopher Columbus (Beacon Hill, Boston)
 Statue of Christopher Columbus (North End, Boston)